Estadio Guillermón Moncada is a multi-use stadium in Santiago de Cuba, Cuba. It is the second largest baseball stadium in Cuba and comfortably seats 25,000 spectators. The stadium was inaugurated on February 24, 1964. It is a project of the Architect Emilio Castro.

The stadium is named after the Cuban patriot Guillermón Moncada, the "Ebony Giant", who was one of the 29 Generals of the Wars of Independence. Born in Santiago de Cuba, he participated in the three wars against Spain. He died in 1896 of tuberculosis in this city.

In its environs there is also a softball stadium, an athletics track, soccer field and a gym for weights and judo.

This stadium is the home of the Avispas de Santiago de Cuba.

References

Baseball venues in Cuba
Buildings and structures in Santiago de Cuba
Softball venues
Sports venues completed in 1964
20th-century architecture in Cuba